X Ambassadors (also stylized XA) are an American pop rock band from Ithaca, New York. Its members currently include lead vocalist Sam Harris, keyboardist Casey Harris, and drummer Adam Levin. Russ Flynn is a touring member that plays guitar and bass. Their most notable songs include "Jungle", "Renegades", and "Unsteady". The band's debut full-length album, VHS, was released on June 30, 2015. Their second album, Orion, was released on June 14, 2019. Their third album, The Beautiful Liar, was released on September 24, 2021.

History

2009–12: Ambassadors and Litost
X Ambassadors began as a band titled Ambassadors, touring with artists such as LIGHTS. During this time, they self-released their debut EP, Ambassadors EP, creating a music video for its lead single, "Tropisms", shot and directed by Rodrigo Zedillo.  Shortly after, the band self-released its debut LP, Litost, which included the song "Litost", which would later be used on the soundtrack for The Host.  The band signed a music publishing deal in 2012 with SONGS Music Publishing. The band started a Kickstarter account to shoot a video for the lead single, "Unconsolable", which would be re-recorded later. The group was noticed by Imagine Dragons while frontman Dan Reynolds was sick in the hospital in Norfolk, Virginia. Reynolds heard an acoustic version of "Unconsolable" on 96X WROX-FM and asked Interscope to sign the band as soon as possible.

2013–14: Love Songs Drug Songs and The Reason
X Ambassadors released their debut major label EP, Love Songs Drug Songs in 2013. The EP included the track "Stranger" co-written by Dan Reynolds.  In promotion of the EP they toured supporting Imagine Dragons, Jimmy Eat World and The Mowglis.  In 2014, the band released a second major label EP, The Reason. Two of the tracks from the EP, "Unsteady" and "Jungle" later appeared on their full-length album VHS released after a year. In promotion of the new EP, X Ambassadors supported Panic! at the Disco and Imagine Dragons on their respective tours. They also featured in The Knocks' single "Comfortable" from their second EP with the same name.

2015–16: VHS
In March 2015, they released the single "Renegades". The song later appeared in their debut LP, "VHS". The album was released June 30, 2015 via digital download, vinyl record and CD. The album features 20 tracks, including 7 interludes and 3 previously released songs for a total of 10 new songs. The album features collaborations with Jamie N Commons and Imagine Dragons. A special edition titled VHS 2.0 was released on June 10, 2016, with five additional tracks and the interludes removed.

X Ambassadors appeared as a collaboration on their earlier title "Comfortable" with The Knocks', which was originally released back in 2013, as part of the duo's debut album, entitled 55, which was released in March 2016. However, later on in the year, X Ambassadors lead singer Sam Harris was reunited with the duo in their new collaboration, entitled "Heat", which was released in October 2016.

On June 20, 2016, the band announced that Feldshuh would be taking an indefinite hiatus from the band to deal with personal issues.

2017: Single releases 
X Ambassadors released four stand-alone singles in 2017: "Hoping" in March, "Torches" in April, "The Devil You Know" in June, and "Ahead of Myself" in July. They also performed at the 2017 National Scout Jamboree. The band was featured in a song by Eminem titled "Bad Husband," off his album Revival. They also performed in a song titled "Home" on the soundtrack for the Netflix film Bright. The song includes pop singer Bebe Rexha and rapper Machine Gun Kelly.

2018–2020: Joyful (cancelled album), Orion, and Belong
X Ambassadors released their next single, "Joyful", on January 26, 2018, originally intended to be the title track of their second album. Later that day they announced their second full-length album, Joyful, through their Instagram accounts, and pre-orders became available through their website. The album was slated for an April 2018 release. On February 2, 2018, the band released another single off the album titled "Don't Stay".

On January 24, 2019, X Ambassadors released their next single titled "Boom". Three months later, on April 19, 2019, over a year after the announcement of the album Joyful, it was announced that the band had cancelled it in favor of their new work for their new upcoming second studio album Orion. "Boom" became the first single off the new album. Lead singer Sam Harris stated that Joyful was the second iteration of their second album, and that they felt like the songs on it did not represent where they were at. The singles released prior to the album's cancellation will continue to be available on streaming services. That same day, the band released another new song titled "Hey Child", as the second single off their new album. A third single from the album, titled "Hold You Down", was released on May 31, 2019. The album was released on June 14, 2019.

On April 19, 2019, American rapper and singer Lizzo released her album "Cuz I Love You", which featured the tracks "Cuz I Love You", "Jerome", and "Heaven Help Me", all produced by X Ambassadors. The band also wrote the song "Baptize Me" with singer Jacob Banks for the Game of Thrones "For The Throne" compilation.

On August 16, 2019, the band was featured on a song titled "In Your Arms", off of Illenium's third studio album titled Ascend.

On August 23, 2019, the band released a politically charged stand-alone single titled "Optimistic." The song centers around gun violence in the United States.

On February 7, 2020, the band released a single titled "Everything Sounds Like a Love Song". It was released as the lead single of the band's upcoming EP. On February 21, 2020, the band released a single titled "Great Unknown" for the theatrical film The Call of the Wild.

On March 6, 2020, the band released a three-song EP titled Belong. It is the band's first EP since The Reason in January 2014. The EP includes the songs "Everything Sounds Like a Love Song", "Happy Home", and "Belong". Lead singer Sam Harris stated that the EP is a collection of songs that the band wrote that didn't quite fit on their upcoming third studio album, but they loved the songs and wanted to put them out. On May 15, 2020, the band released another single, "Zen," featuring K.Flay and grandson. The song is about the COVID-19 Pandemic.

2021–present: (Eg) and The Beautiful Liar
On January 14, 2021, X Ambassadors released a single called "ultraviolet.tragedies," a heavily rap-focused song featuring Terrell Hines. It is the first single from an upcoming collaborations project (Eg). Sam Harris said that with this project he wanted to "give a voice to (several) incredible artists that people may not have heard yet, and really let their imagination be at the forefront of everything." On February 7, 2021, the band released a cover of "Blinding Lights" by The Weeknd.

On February 12, 2021, they released the next single from (Eg), "skip.that.party," featuring Jensen McRae. They released the third and presumably final single from (Eg), "torture," on March 12, 2021, featuring Earl St. Clair.

On June 11, 2021, the band released a new song titled "My Own Monster", which was also announced to be the lead single off their upcoming third studio album The Beautiful Liar. "Okay" was released as the second single on July 30, 2021, while "Adrenaline" was released as the third single on August 13, 2021. The album was released on September 24, 2021, along with a music video for the song "Beautiful Liar." A tour for the record began in October 2021.

The Beautiful Liar is a concept album that plays out similarly to a radio drama, which expresses themes of insanity, powerlessness, self-doubt, and anxiety. It tells the story of a blind little girl whose shadow comes to life. It has an edgier trap-influenced sound, a contrast from the band's previous releases, and tells its story over the course of 16 tracks. Sam and Casey said that the album was influenced from radio shows that they would listen to as children, which they would listen to instead of watching TV because Casey is blind. On the album, Sam said "I wanted to make an album that felt as unhinged as I did, and as the whole world felt around me. So Adam, Casey and I carved ourselves a space where we could all be as ugly, weird, funny, and f'd up as we wanted to be."

On October 22, 2021, the band released "Water," a song for the Blade Runner: Black Lotus soundtrack. On May 12, 2022, they released a remix of their song "Palo Santo" featuring ROBI.

Musical style and influences
In an interview with Caitlin White, X Ambassadors declared themselves distinctly rock with few characteristics commonly associated with indie bands. They referenced Incubus and the Red Hot Chili Peppers as heroes. The band also often includes political themes in their songs.

The band includes a lot of different eclectic sounds in their songs, such as jazz, alternative, trap, and R&B. One source said Casey Harris being blind has been a major part of shaping who the band is.

Philanthropy
In January 2017, Sam Harris participated in the official Women's March on Washington after-party. Harris was joined by The National, Ani DiFranco, Samantha Ronson, Sleater-Kinney, and many others.

In March 2017, X Ambassadors performed a special show to benefit Planned Parenthood on International Women's Day.

Following the benefit show, X Ambassadors released the song "Hoping" on March 10. All proceeds from the song for the six months following its release were donated to the ACLU.

In June 2017, X Ambassadors announced that they would donate all the proceeds from their Mississippi Coast Coliseum Show to Unity Mississippi - an LGBT charitable organization, following the announcement that the State of Mississippi signed HB 1523 - the "Protecting Freedom of Conscience from Government Discrimination Act" into law.

The single cover for the band's 2019 single "Optimistic" is the link to an organization against gun violence-related attacks, which the band themselves donated to.

Band members

Sam Nelson Harris – lead vocals, guitar, saxophone, bass guitar, drums, percussion (2009–present)
Casey Harris – piano, keyboards, backing vocals (2009–present)
Adam Levin – drums, percussion (2009–present)

Touring member
Russ Flynn – guitar, bass (2016–present)

Former member
Noah Feldshuh – lead guitar, bass guitar, keyboards, backing vocals (2009–2016; currently on hiatus)

Members information
Sam and Casey Harris are brothers; their father, Rob Harris, is a unit publicist in the film industry. They have been friends with Feldshuh since kindergarten in Ithaca. Sam met Levin while attending the New School in New York City in 2006.
 Casey Harris has been blind since birth.
Noah Feldshuh is the eldest son of playwright David Feldshuh and a nephew of the actress Tovah Feldshuh.

Discography 

VHS (2015)
Orion (2019)
The Beautiful Liar (2021)

Awards and nominations

References

External links

Alternative rock groups from New York (state)
Indie rock musical groups from New York (state)
Musical groups established in 2009
American musical groups
Blind musicians